The Slammin' Salmon is a 2009 American comedy film by Broken Lizard. It is about the owner of a restaurant who holds a contest to see which one of his waiters can earn the most money in a single night. The winner receives $10,000, and the loser receives a "beat down" by the owner, Cleon Salmon, a former heavyweight boxer (played by Michael Clarke Duncan). Kevin Heffernan directed the film, his first time for a Broken Lizard film.

Plot summary
In Miami, Florida, retired heavyweight boxing champion Cleon Salmon owns the restaurant The Slammin' Salmon. His staff consists of manager Rich, eccentric waiter Nuts, callous Guy, pre-med Tara, ballet student Mia, aspiring actor Connor, angry chef Dave and his busboy twin brother Donnie. Cleon informs Rich that the restaurant needs to make $20,000 by the end of the night so that he can pay off a wager he made with the yakuza.  If they can't make enough money, the yakuza will take the restaurant.

Rich initially offers the top selling waiter two tickets to an upcoming  Norah Jones concert.  After a slow start Rich realizes he needs to offer a better prize.  He perfectly impersonates Cleon's voice and books a vacation at a resort hotel in Key Largo. Now motivated, the staff step up their efforts to sell.  Connor is approached by movie star Marlon Specter who asks him to hide an engagement ring for his girlfriend in her dessert.  Rich eats the dessert and swallows the engagement ring after Connor is distracted by Mia.  Connor tells Marlon what happened and Marlon threatens to beat both Rich and Connor if they don't get it back.  Meanwhile, Nuts begins acting strange while serving and Mia suffers a first-degree burn after Guy trips over Donnie and spills a piping hot soup in her face.  Tara looks at Mia's burn and tells her she should go home but Mia refuses and Rich encourages her to keep selling.

Cleon tracks down Rich and asks for the total so far.  Rich informs them they are at $12,000 and an angry Cleon demands that the entire wait staff gather in his office immediately.  Cleon starts off by humiliating Rich in front of the staff before yelling at everyone for their poor results so far.  Nuts begins acting weirder by spit polishing Cleon's boxing trophy.  To further motivate them, Cleon changes the prize for top seller to $10,000 in cash to be awarded at the end of the night.  He also warns them that the bottom seller will earn themselves a beating from Cleon.  After the staff leave, Rich tries to explain to Cleon that he's making it worse by offering the money, but Cleon tells him to make the needed money or face a beating himself.

The staff begin using every trick they know to pad their customer's checks.  Rich promotes an inebriated Donnie to waiter and adds extra tables for him against his objections.  Donnie makes a mess at his first table and then panics after Cleon stops him in the kitchen and reminds him that if he finishes last Cleon will beat him.  A panicked Donnie attempts to run away from the restaurant only to be stopped by Cleon who forces him to go back.  Connor is embarrassed when the cast of the TV show he was fired from show up to eat and get seated in his section.  Connor corners his old boss in the restroom to talk about why he was fired and gets angrily told off.  Meanwhile, Guy grows impatient with a customer who won't order anything and gives the table to Donnie.  Tara reminds Nuts to take his medication but Rich distracts him and he misses his dose.  Nuts then transforms into his bizarre split personality Zongo.  Zongo becomes a selling machine, moving Nuts from last place to first.  The rest of the staff grab Zongo and force him to take his medication, transforming him back into Nuts.  After Guy fills Nuts in on what he missed Nuts runs to the bathroom and vomits his medication out, becoming Zongo again.  Rich consumes a bowl of pasta made by Dave and finally expels the engagement ring.

Guy gets angry when Donnie overtakes him on the scoreboard. Desperate to avoid a beating, Guy sabotages both Donnie and Mia's biggest tables.  Tara gets stiffed on her tip by pop star Nutella, pushing her out of first place.  Connor finally delivers dessert to Marlon's table and watches in disgust as Marlon's girlfriend eagerly eats it.  She finds the engagement ring and accepts Marlon's proposal.  Zongo finally snaps and is knocked out by Cleon after attacking a customer and trying to force-feed him an entire fish.  Rich asks Tara to check on Nuts but instead she admonishes him for how he has treated the staff because he's afraid of Cleon.

At closing time, the man at the table that Guy gave to Donnie leaves Donnie a $1,000 tip.  Donnie refuses it at first, but the man explains that he is dying and that he appreciated that Donnie let him sit there without bothering him.  The man is then trampled to death by Cleon's horse as he leaves the restaurant.  Rich gathers the wait staff and announces the top-seller as Tara, who is shocked to find out that Donnie gave her his $1,000 tip so that she'd win.  Cleon finds out that they only made $19,000 for the night and decides to take the waiters tips to make up the difference.  He also tells Tara that he lied about the $10,000 prize.  Rich finally confronts Cleon, taking the waiters tips back and demanding he pay Tara.  Tara realizes that Cleon only needed 20,000 yen ($170), not dollars.  Cleon takes the $170 out, gives Tara her $10,000 prize, and then throws the rest up in the air for the waiters to fight over. Cleon is shown later with Guy tied up in his office about to receive his beating for being last.

Cast

Release 
The film premiered at the Slamdance Film Festival on January 17, 2009. It was released to limited theaters in the United States on December 11, 2009. On April 13, 2010, the film was released on DVD and Blu-ray.

Reception
The film received mostly negative reviews. Rotten Tomatoes reported that 35% of critics gave the film a positive review based on a sample of 26, and an average score of 4.9 out of 10. Neil Genzlinger of The New York Times praised Duncan's performance, but noted that many of the jokes in the film are tired and old. Michael O'Sullivan, writing for The Washington Post, noted that the film engages in "lowbrow insults and slapsticky shenanigans" and its humor "hovers around crotch level."

References

External links
 
 
 On-set interviews with cast
 Interview with Broken Lizard members Steve Lemme and Kevin Heffernan

2009 films
2009 comedy films
American boxing films
Broken Lizard
Cooking films
Films directed by Kevin Heffernan (actor)
Films set in Miami
Films set in restaurants
Yakuza films
2009 directorial debut films
2000s English-language films
2000s American films
2000s Japanese films